The men's 100m breaststroke SB7 event at the 2012 Summer Paralympics took place at the London Aquatics Centre on 1 September. There were two heats; the swimmers with the eight fastest times advanced to the final.

Results

Heats
Competed from 11:42.

Heat 1

Heat 2

Final
Competed at 20:20.

 
'Q = qualified for final. WR = World Record. PR = Paralympic Record.  DSQ = Disqualified. DNS = Did not start.

References
Official London 2012 Paralympics Results: Heats 
Official London 2012 Paralympics Results: Final 

Swimming at the 2012 Summer Paralympics